Carlos Iturri (7 May 1917 – 23 August 1999) was a Peruvian fencer. He competed in the individual épée event at the 1948 Summer Olympics.

References

External links
 

1917 births
1999 deaths
Peruvian male épée fencers
Olympic fencers of Peru
Fencers at the 1948 Summer Olympics